The 2020 United States Senate election in Montana was held on November 3, 2020, to elect a member of the United States Senate to represent the State of Montana. It was held concurrently with the 2020 U.S. presidential election, as well as other elections to the United States Senate in other states, elections to the United States House of Representatives, and various state and local elections. The primaries for both the Democratic and Republican nominations took place on June 2, 2020.

Originally this seat was projected to be a safe Republican hold. However, Steve Bullock, Montana's popular Democratic governor, entered the race on the last day to file, which shifted the dynamics of the contest dramatically; many political pundits then considered it a competitive race and potential pickup for Democrats. Polling reflected that at a point too, with one poll even showing Bullock leading by 7 points. These predictions ultimately did not come to fruition, however, as Daines would wind up winning a second term by a relatively comfortable 10-point margin.

This marked the first time since 2000 where Montana voted for a Republican governor, president, and senator all on the same ballot. As the Green Party was removed from the ballot and both Libertarian nominees withdrew, this was the first time since 1988 that there were no third-party candidates running for either United States House of Representatives or United States Senate in Montana.

Republican primary

Candidates

Nominee
Steve Daines, incumbent U.S. Senator

Eliminated in primary
John Driscoll, former Democratic Speaker of the Montana House of Representatives (1977–1979)
Daniel Larson, hardware store manager

Endorsements

Results

Democratic primary
Following Steve Bullock's entry shortly before the March 9 filing deadline, several Democrats dropped from the race.

Candidates

Nominee
 Steve Bullock, incumbent Governor of Montana and former candidate for President of the United States in 2020

Eliminated in primary
John Mues, nuclear engineer and U.S. Navy veteran

Withdrawn
Jack Ballard, former professor at Montana State University Billings (endorsed Bullock)
Wilmot Collins, mayor of Helena (endorsed Bullock)
 Mike Knoles, mathematician, physicist, and data analyst (endorsed Bullock) (remained on ballot)
Cora Neumann, public health expert and founder of the Global First Ladies Alliance (endorsed Bullock)
Josh Seckinger, fishing guide (endorsed Bullock)

Declined
Michael Punke, writer and former U.S. ambassador to the World Trade Organization
Brian Schweitzer, former Governor of Montana
Kathleen Williams, former state representative and nominee for Montana's at-large congressional district in 2018 (running for Montana's at-large congressional district)

Endorsements

Results

Other candidates

Libertarian Party
After Susan Geise officially withdrew, the Montana Libertarian Party could name a replacement candidate for the general election. However, during a meeting to select a replacement candidate, a majority of party officials selected not to have a replacement candidate, with "none of the above" winning the most votes.

Withdrawn
Eric Fulton, Republican candidate for District 65 of the Montana House of Representatives in 2014
Susan Geise, Lewis and Clark County commissioner and former chair of the Montana Republican Party

Green Party

Disqualified
Wendie Fredrickson, former audit reviewer for Montana State Department of Public Health and Human Services

Eliminated in primary
Dennis Daneke, retired college professor

Results

General election

Debate

Predictions

Endorsements

Polling
Graphical summary

Aggregate Polls

University of Montana polls did not account for certain presumed withdrawals of major party candidates after their primaries in the following polls.
Steve Daines vs Steve Bullock, Wilmot Collins, Mike Knoles, Cora Neumann, and John Mues

Steve Daines vs Jack Ballard, Wilmot Collins, and John Mues

Results 

Counties that flipped from Republican to Democratic
 Gallatin (largest municipality: Bozeman)
 Lewis and Clark (largest municipality: Helena)
 Roosevelt (largest municipality: Wolf Point)

Notes

Partisan clients

References

Further reading

External links
 
 
  (State affiliate of the U.S. League of Women Voters)
 

Official campaign websites
 Steve Bullock (D) for Senate
 Steve Daines (R) for Senate

Montana
United States Senate
2020
Steve Bullock (American politician)